Chad Fitzgerald Fann (born June 7, 1970) is an American former football tight end who played in the National Football League (NFL) for the Phoenix/Arizona Cardinals and San Francisco 49ers from 1993 to 1999 for a total of 72 career games while making 15 starts.

Fann signed with the Minnesota Vikings on March 31, 2000, but retired on July 26, 2000.

References

Living people
1970 births
Players of American football from Florida
Florida A&M Rattlers football players
San Francisco 49ers players
Arizona Cardinals players
Minnesota Vikings players
American football tight ends
Ole Miss Rebels football players